Mamungkukumpurangkuntjunya Hill (or Mamungkukumpurangkuntjunya)  is a hill in the Australian state of South Australia located in the Anangu Pitjantjatjara Yankunytjatjara lands about  west of the town of Marla and about  south-west of the settlement of Mimili.

The name means "where the devil urinates" in the regional Pitjantjatjara language and was recorded during a field trip organised by an unspecified state government agency in May 1989.  It was gazetted on 4 November 2010 by the Government of South Australia  as "Mamungkukumpurangkuntjunya" without the word "hill".  The name is the longest official place name in Australia.

See also
List of long place names
List of unusual place names

References

Further reading

Anangu Pitjantjatjara Yankunytjatjara
Mountains of South Australia